Böcker is a German-language surname. Notable people with the surname include:

Conrad Böcker (1871–1936), German gymnast
Thomas Böcker (born 1977), German music producer

See also
Bäcker
Becker (disambiguation)
Böckler
Booker (name)

German-language surnames